The Journal of Ginseng Research is a bimonthly peer-reviewed open-access scientific journal covering all aspects of research on ginseng, from basic science to pre-clinical and clinical research. It was established in 1976 as Koryŏ Insam Hakhoe (English: Korean Journal of Ginseng Science), obtaining its current name in 1998. The journal is published by  Elsevier on behalf of The Korean Society of Ginseng and the editor-in-chief is Jong-Hoon Kim (Jeonbuk National University). The journal publishes review articles, research articles, and brief reports.

Abstracting and indexing
The journal is abstracted and indexed in:
Biological Abstracts
BIOSIS Previews
CAB Abstracts
Food Science and Technology Abstracts
Science Citation Index Expanded
Scopus
According to the Journal Citation Reports, the journal has a 2021 impact factor of 5.735.

References

External links

Elsevier academic journals
Bimonthly journals
English-language journals
Publications established in 1976
Alternative and traditional medicine journals
Botany journals
Creative Commons Attribution-licensed journals